Muhammad Khalid Khurshid Khan (Urdu: محمد خالد خورشید خان ; born 17 November 1980) is a Pakistani lawyer and politician who is the current Chief Minister of Gilgit-Baltistan de facto province of Pakistan, from the Pakistan Tehreek-e-Insaf. He has been a member of the Gilgit Baltistan Assembly since 25 November 2020.

Early life and education
Khan was born on 17 November 1980 in Rattu area of Shounter Tehsil in Astore District. He belongs to the Machoque tribe. He matriculated from Public School and College, Gilgit and did his graduation from Lahore. He received degree in law from Queen Mary University of London , England. He practiced law in London before returning to Pakistan to participate in politics.

Political career

Khalid Khurshid tabled Provisional Provincial Status Motion for Gilgit-Baltistan in Gilgit Baltistan Assembly and got it unanimously approved. Khalid is recognized as an expert in constitutional law which facilitated process of granting  Provisional Provincial Status to Gilgit-Baltistan. Khalid is being credited for bringing in mega development projects in GB and for his vision of development by improving connectivty of region with rest of country. He started mega development projects like Astore Valley Road, Shah rahe Nagar, Shonter tunnel, Gilgit-Chitral Road, Darel Tangir Express Way and a Power Project in Ataabad,Hunza. He established Gilgit Baltistan Information Technology and Irrigation Departments as a special initiative of Chief Minister. Khalid launched a vigorous campaign for approval of mega development projects in Gilgit-Baltistan in federation and ultimately succeeded in approval of largest development package for the region.

His political career started in 2009 when he lost his first election for Gilgit-Baltistan Legislative Assembly as an independent candidate. He joined Pakistan Tehreek-e-Insaf on 28 July 2018. In 2019 appointed President of Pakistan Tehreek-e-Insaf Astore-Diamer Division.

Khan contested 2020 Gilgit-Baltistan Assembly election on 15 November 2020 from constituency GBA-13 (Astore-1) on the ticket of Pakistan Tehreek-e-Insaf. He won the election by the margin of 1,719 votes over the runner up Farman of PMLN. He garnered 6089 votes while the runnerup Rana Farman received 5000 plus votes. PTI had nominated Khalid Khurshid Khan as candidate for Chief Minister Gilgit-Baltistan on 27 November 2020. On 30 November 2020, he was elected as Chief Minister of Gigit-Baltistan.

Under the GB Investment Program, Khalid  partnered with the private sector and academia to attract new investors to invest in Gilgit-Baltistan and succeeded in signing thirty two MOU with various investors at Dubai Expo.

Personal life 
Khalid belongs to an influential political family of Gilgit Baltistan. His father Justice (retd.) Muhammad Khurshid Khan won his seat with a big margin in first ever elections from Astore 1, GBLA 13, held in Gilgit Baltistan in 1973. He later on joined the judiciary and retired as Chief Justice, Chief Court of Gilgit-Baltistan in November 2004. His uncle, Haji Muhammad Inayat Khan, served as the chairman of District Council Diamer for three consecutive terms from 1981 to 1994.

One of his brother, Atif Khurshid, was an International Civil Servant, worked for United Nations Children's Fund as social policy head and currently working as CEO of Social Benefit and Income Support at Ministry of Human Resource and Social Development, Kingdom of Saudi Arabia. Khalid's eldest brother, Dr. Arif Khurshid, is a surgeon in Kingdom of Saudi Arabia. Khalid's younger brother, Hanif Ullah Khan, is a civil servant currently posted as Deputy Inspector General (DIG) of Police. Khalid's sister, Ayesha Khurshid is deputy chief in Gilgit Baltistan's Planning and Development Department.

Khalid is married into an influential Pirzada, Syed family of village Gudai, district Astore. Khalid's father in law Pirzada Muhammad Alam (late) was a well reputed civil servant. Khalid's wife, Mrs. Riffat Alam is a professor in KIU heading Media Sciences Department.

Khalid is a disciple of acclaimed religious scholar Pir Mian Shafi Jhagvi of Neelum District in Azad Kashmir.

References

1980 births
Living people
Gilgit-Baltistan MLAs 2020–2025
Politicians from Gilgit-Baltistan
Chief Ministers of Gilgit-Baltistan
People from Astore District
Pakistan Tehreek-e-Insaf politicians